"Road 2 Soulwave" is an extended play album by Nigerian R&B/Soul singer, songwriter and record producer, Jasën Blu.

Background 
Shortly after the release of his Afrofusion-flavored remake of D'Angelo's 1995 neo-soul staple, "Brown Sugar" (retitled "Brown Shuga" for Blu's own remake), Blu initially announced the completion of his debut album, titled "Soulwave" via social late 2019, and projected an early 2020 release. However, partly due to the COVID-19 pandemic that grounded all entertainment activities worldwide from late February, plans were halted for the album release and after releasing one more single, "Love Or Nothin'" from the album in April, Blu detoured from initial plans and announced a prequel EP instead.

Musical style, writing, composition 
Blu infused a diverse range of production styles across all five tracks on the primarily R&B/soul EP, including a spacy guitar-based Afro-fusion orchestration on "Intro (One Hunnid)" and afrobeats and hip hop on "Brown Shuga", which contains heavy lyrical references to D'Angelo's 1995 song "Brown Sugar". On Bigmaxx-assisted slowburn track, "Enough", Blu employs a melancholy down-tempo, dark and ambient production style, with Bigmaxx's verse on the track as the EP's only guest appearance. Blu re-wrote the first verse of Usher's 2001 Grammy-winning single "U Remind Me" in Pidgin English and performs a Nigerian-flavored remake on a breezy ambient background of grandpiano and strings for "U Remind Me (2020 Pidgin Acoustic)". A prevalent theme across the album is Blu's signature style of recording low-frequency layers behind his background vocals resulting in a thick, warm feel reminiscent of Ryan Leslie's vocal styles on some of his recordings. Blu's musical style has also been compared to '90s R&B by listeners.

Recording, production 
Production and recordings on "Road 2 Soulwave" were conducted between the year 2013 and 2020, with Blu helming entire production on all tracks using FL Studio. The earliest recording on the EP is "When I Get Home/Been Ready", whose first half was recorded at GameUp Studio in Ikeja, Lagos in 2013, and the latter part, on which Blu simply slows down a selected portion of the instrumetal on "When I Get Home" and recorded a new verse on it, was recorded at Blu's longtime friend and occasional collaborator Daccoustic's House of Daccoustic studio on the Federal University of Technology Akure main campus in Akure in 2016. Every other recording was completed at Beverly Studio, Lagos between February 2019 and September 2020.

Artwork, packaging 
The "Road 2 Soulwave" EP artwork was designed by Blu himself for his digital arts company, Props Media using an original studio photography by Lagos-based photographer, Morgan Otagburuagu. Themes from the artwork was also incorporated in the promotional campaign of the EP.

Release, promotion, marketing 
"Road 2 Soulwave" was released digitally to the rest of the world on October 9, 2020, and later released in Nigeria on November 5 due the #EndSARS protests, a civil uprising against police brutality that erupted in Lagos and several other major Nigerian cities in October 2020.

Track listing

Personnel 

Adapted from EP liner notes**

 Jasën Blu, primary artist, production, engineering, art direction, designer.
 George "Chillz" Ezeh, promotions
 Sydney Okoduwa, project co-ordination
 Morgan Otagburuagu, photography
 Immanuel Udochukwu, visual content
 Seun "Bigmaxx" Makanjuola, featured artist

Additional musicians 
 Paul "Tyemmy" Ojo-Ade, additional keyboard on "Enough"

Release history

References 

2020 EPs
Albums by Nigerian artists